The 1991 Individual Speedway World Championship was the 46th edition of the official World Championship to determine the world champion rider.

Diminutive Danish rider Jan O. Pedersen won his first and only World Championship with a 15-point maximum from his five rides, the last time a rider would have a perfect score in the Final. Local favourite Tony Rickardsson finished second with 12 points, with triple champion Hans Nielsen of Denmark finishing third on 11 points after defeating fellow Dane Tommy Knudsen in a run-off. Defending champion Per Jonsson finished in ninth place with 7 points.

Overseas Qualification

Australian Qualification

Australian Final
 27 January 1991
  Alice Springs, Arunga Park Speedway
First 3 to Commonwealth final
Leigh Adams seeded to Commonwealth Final

* Phil Crump replaced injured Victorian Champion Leigh Adams

New Zealand Qualification

American Final
March 2, 1991
 Long Beach, Veterans Memorial Stadium
First 5 to Overseas final plus 1 reserve

Swedish Final
May 14–15, June 2, 1991
 - 3 Rounds (Kumla, Västervik & Stockholm)
First 5 to Nordic final plus 1 reserve

British Final
May 19, 1991
 Coventry, Brandon Stadium
First 10 to Commonwealth final plus 1 reserve

Danish Final
May 19, 1991
 - Fladbro, Fldbro Morotbane
First 6 to Nordic final plus 1 reserve

Commonwealth Final
June 2, 1991
 - King's Lynn, Norfolk Arena
First 11 to Overseas final plus 1 reserve

* Todd Wiltshire replaced Glyn Taylor

Overseas Final
June 23, 1991
 - Bradford, Odsal Stadium
First 9 to World Semi-final plus 1 reserve

Nordic Final
June 23, 1991
 - Brovst, Nordjylland Speedway Center
First 9 to World Semi-final plus 1 reserve

Continental Qualification

World Semi-Final #1
August 11, 1991
 - Rovno, Rivne Speedway
First 8 to World final plus 1 reserve

World Semi-Final #2
August 18, 1991
 - Abensberg, Motorstadion
First 8 to World final plus 1 reserve

* First reserve Tony Rickardsson replaced injured qualifier Andy Smith

World final
August 31, 1991
 Göteborg, Ullevi

Classification

References

External links

The finals at SVT's open archive 

1991
World Individual
Individual Speedway